Algimonas porphyrae is a Gram-negative bacterium from the genus of Algimonas which has been isolated from the alga Porphyra yezoensis.

References 

Caulobacterales
Bacteria described in 2013